Canicattì is a town and comune (municipality) in the Province of Agrigento in the Italian region Sicily, located about  southeast of Palermo and about  east of Agrigento. In 2016, it had a population of 35,698.

History
The archaeological remains in the city and in the neighbourhood testify the presence of a settlement before the Roman age. During the conquest of Sicily by the Normans, the local Muslim lord was besieged and defeated by baron Salvatore Palmieri (1087), a follower of Roger I of Sicily: the latter, as reward, offered him a sword and the lordship over the fief. Under the Palmieri rule the Arab fortress was enlarged, becoming a true castle with a tower.

The Normans were followed by the Hohenstaufen and the French Angevines, in turn ousted by the House of Barcelona. In 1448 the fief of Canicattì was ceded by Antonio Palmieri, who was heirless, to his nephew Andrea De Crescenzio, who obtained by king John II of Aragon the Licentia populandi, i.e. the permission to enlarge the fief's boundaries, increase its population and administer justice. Under Andrea De Crescenzio Canicattì was a rural community including some 1000/1500 inhabitants, living in the upper part of the town. Andrea De Crescenzio was succeeded by his son Giovanni, who, having no sons, left the barony to his father-in-law Francesco Calogero Bonanno, in 1507.

Under the Bonannos the town experienced a considerable demographic growth, and several large edifices and fountains were erected. The Bonanno seigniory started to decline from the later 18th century. In 1819 the last Bonanno left Canicattì to baron Gabriele Chiaramonte Bordonaro. After the riots of 1848 and 1859/1861, and the unification of Italy, banks, mills and plants were built in the town, increasing its trades. For the whole 20th century the economy remained based on agriculture (mostly grapes), trades and services.

In 1943 it was the seat of the Canicattì massacre, in which American troops killed several Italian civilians who were looting a factory and refusing to disperse despite warnings.

Geography
The municipality, located in the eastern area of the province, at the borders with the one of Caltanissetta, borders with Caltanissetta (CL), Castrofilippo, Delia (CL), Montedoro (CL), Naro, Racalmuto and Serradifalco (CL).

The old town of Canicattì is divided into the wards of Borgalino and Badia. Other wards are Acquanova, Rovitelli, and other minor wards named after the local parish churches.

Canicattì is 21 km from Favara, 29 from Caltanissetta, 34 from Agrigento, 38 from Licata, 61 from Enna and 68 from Gela.

Main sights 
 San Diego
 San Giuseppe
 Chiesa del Purgatorio
 San Francesco 
 San Domenico
 Santa Lucia
 Chiesa Madre or San Pancrazio
 Maria SS. Degli Agonizzanti
 Santo Spirito
 Santi Filippo e Giacomo
 San Biagio
 San Calogero
 Santa Maria Ausiliatrice
 San Eduardo

Transport
Canicattì station is an important hub for local rail transport and, until 2011, it was served by express trains linking Agrigento with Rome, Milan and Turin. It is a junction point between the lines Caltanissetta-Canicattì-Agrigento and Canicattì-Gela-Syracuse and, until the 1950s, the terminus of two narrow-gauge lines: the  Canicattì-Naro (a branch of the Agrigento-Favara-Naro-Licata) and the Canicattì-Riesi-Caltagirone.

People
Giovanni Canova (1880–1960), fencer
Gioacchino La Lomia (1831–1905), capuchin missionary
Rosario Livatino (1952–1990), magistrate

See also
 Canicattì massacre

References

External links

 Official website 
 History of Canicattì and photos 

 
Cities and towns in Sicily